They Listen is an upcoming American horror film written and directed by Chris Weitz. It stars Katherine Waterston, John Cho and Lukita Maxwell. Jason Blum and Weitz produce through their Blumhouse Productions and Depth of Field banners respectively, alongside Andrew Miano.

They Listen is set to be released in the United States on August 25, 2023 by Sony Pictures Releasing.

Cast
 Katherine Waterston
 John Cho
 Riki Lindhome
 Lukita Maxwell
 Greg Hill
 Havana Rose Liu

Production
The film is produced by Weitz's production company Depth of Field, with backing from Blumhouse and Sony Pictures. It is also produced by Jason Blum and Andrew Miano, with Bea Sequeira, Dan Balgoyen, Britta Rowings, and Paul Davis as executive producers. In December 2022, Katherine Waterston
and John Cho were revealed to be cast. In February 2023, Greg Hill and Lukita Maxwell were reported to be part of the cast. That same month, Riki Lindhome and Havana Rose Liu were revealed to be in the cast.

Principal photography began in Los Angeles in December 2022.

Release
The film has a planned release date of August 25, 2023.

References

External links

Upcoming films
2023 films
2023 horror films
2020s American films
2020s English-language films
American horror films
Blumhouse Productions films
Films directed by Chris Weitz
Films produced by Jason Blum
Films shot in Los Angeles
Films with screenplays by Chris Weitz
Sony Pictures films
Upcoming English-language films